The Main Moscow derby is the name of the association football local derby between two Moscow based teams – Spartak and CSKA. Both Spartak and CSKA fans (they often call each other "Myaso" (meat) and "Koni" (horses) respectively) have recognized each other as rivals.

History
The first derby between Spartak and CSKA (at that time known as MKS and OLLS respectively) took place on 1 June 1922. The OLLS won 4–2. As of 20 September 2021, Spartak won 83 times, CSKA 72, and 37 matches ended in a draw.

Records
 The biggest win of Spartak in the Moscow Championship — 8–0.
 The biggest win of CSKA in the Moscow Championship — 1–6.
 The biggest win of Spartak in the Soviet Top League — 0–5.
 The biggest win of CSKA in the Soviet Top League — 5–1.
 The biggest win of Spartak in the Russian Premier League — 0–6.
 The biggest win of CSKA in the Russian Premier League — 1–5, 0–4.
 The biggest win of Spartak in the Soviet Cup — 4–0.
 The biggest win of CSKA in the Soviet Cup — 0–3.
 The biggest win of Spartak in the Russian Cup — no.
 The biggest win of CSKA in the Russian Cup — 3–0.
 Highest scoring match — 9 goals in a 4–5 Spartak triumph.
 Highest attendance — 105,000, on 8 June 1959, on 25 July 1960 and on 4 October 1962.
 On 26 July 2009, there were 70,000 fans in the match; it is the record attendance in the Russian Championship until now.
 Lowest attendance — 4000, on 24 October 1993.
 64 times the Derby took place in the Luzhniki Stadium.
 The highest goal-scorer in the history of the Derby is Vágner Love, with 9 goals. Sergei Salnikov is second with 7.

See also
 Moscow Basketball derby 
 List of association football rivalries
 Spartak Moscow–Dynamo Kyiv derby
 Russia's oldest derby - Spartak Moscow vs. Dynamo Moscow

References

External links
 Football derbies: Spartak Moscow vs CSKA Moscow
 CSKA-games.ru: Spartak Moscow vs CSKA Moscow

FC Spartak Moscow
PFC CSKA Moscow
Football derbies in Russia